John Patton Erwin (1795–1857) was an American Whig politician. He served as the Mayor of Nashville, Tennessee from 1821 to 1822, and from 1834 to 1835.

Early life
John Patton Erwin was born on January 8, 1795, in Wilkes County, North Carolina. His father was Col. Andrew Patton Erwin, a land speculator, and his mother, Jane Patton. He had nine siblings. His brothers-in-law included John Williams, U.S. Senator from Tennessee, Lewis Williams, a U.S. Representative from North Carolina, and Thomas Lanier Williams, Justice of the Tennessee Supreme Court.

Career
In 1817, he became an alderman in Nashville and in 1820 he was admitted to the bar. He served as Mayor of Nashville from 1821 to 1822. He also served as Principal Clerk of the Tennessee House of Representatives as well as editor of the Nashville Whig. He was opposed to Andrew Jackson. In 1826, President John Quincy Adams appointed him United States Postmaster in Nashville.

In 1827, he described David Crockett as, "not only illiterate, but he is rough & uncouth, talks much & loudly, and is by far, more in his proper place when hunting a Bear" yet also "independent and fearless & has a popularity at home that is unaccountable."

Later, he served as Cashier at the Yeateman, Woods Bank. In 1830, he became Justice of the Peace for two terms. From 1834 to 1835, he served as Mayor of Nashville a second time.

Personal life
He married Frances Lanier Williams (1796–1872), a member of the Lanier family, in 1815. They had four daughters, Ellen, Mary Caroline, Rebecca and Amelia. In his last years, he was paralyzed. In 1831, he bought the "Buena Vista" mansion.

Death and legacy
He died on August 27, 1857, and he is buried in the Nashville City Cemetery. After his death, his widow sold them "Buena Vista" mansion to the Dominican Sisters of St. Cecilia.

References

1795 births
1857 deaths
People from Wilkes County, North Carolina
Tennessee Whigs
19th-century American politicians
Mayors of Nashville, Tennessee
Burials in Tennessee